Felix G. McGavock (died 1897) was a politician in Arkansas. He lived in Mississippi County, Arkansas and represented it in the Arkansas House of Representatives in 1883. He was a nephew of Felix Grundy of Tennessee.

References

1897 deaths
Year of birth missing